Emma Qauglia (born 15 August 1980) is an Italian marathon runner.

Biography
Emma Qauglia finished sixth at the 2013 World Championships in Athletics – Women's Marathon after suffering from cancer.

Achievements

See also
 Italy at the 2013 World Championships in Athletics

References

External links
 

1980 births
Living people
Italian female marathon runners
Italian female long-distance runners
Italian female steeplechase runners
Sportspeople from Genoa
World Athletics Championships athletes for Italy
20th-century Italian women
21st-century Italian women